The Mark Price Arena is a 2,500-seat multi-purpose arena in Enid, Oklahoma located in Convention Hall, named after basketball player Mark Price who played for Georgia Tech and the Cleveland Cavaliers.
  In addition to hosting concerts and high school sports, the arena was home to the Oklahoma Storm, a basketball team in the USBL. Convention Hall underwent renovations and reopened on November 18, 2012 as part of Veteran's Day festivities. Upon reopening, Convention Hall housed two new ballrooms totalling 14,000 sq ft and 5,500 sq ft of additional meeting rooms.

History

In 1919, Milton C. Garber, then mayor of Enid, and his commissioner aides, G. W. Pancoast and Jason W. Butts, proposed a bond issue for the construction of a building to memorialize the efforts of Garfield County soldiers in World War I. Sealed bids were accepted until September 1, 1919 on bonds of $250,000 for the construction of the convention hall. The building was constructed at a cost of $500,000 with an original capacity of 5,000. It was designed by the architectural firm Layton, Smith and Forsyth and constructed by Bass and Frankenfield Builders. It served as a meeting place for the Enid Chamber of Commerce. The hall served as a venue for stage productions including plays such as Hitchy-Koo and Al G. Field minstrel shows and for musicians such as John Philip Sousa, Ernestine Schumann-Heink, Bob Wills, and Fred Waring. President George Bush spoke at the venue while campaigning in 1992.

The original hall was four stories tall, and had two balconies: the first of which holds 995 people and the second 667 people. The 2,500 seat basketball arena in Convention Hall was renamed in 1993 to Mark Price Arena after basketball player Mark Price who played for Georgia Tech and the Cleveland Cavaliers. In addition to hosting concerts and high school sports, the arena was home to the Oklahoma Storm, a basketball team in the USBL. The Skeltur Conference Tournament was held at the arena from 1964 to 2012.

Renovations
In May 2011, city officials attended a groundbreaking to begin the Enid Renaissance Project which would build a new Enid Event Center and renovate Convention Hall. W. L. McNatt and Company, of Oklahoma City was awarded a 7,082,000 dollar renovation contract for the building, including creation of an 11,000 sq ft ballroom, a 3,000 sq ft ballroom and 5,500 sq ft of meeting areas.

References

External links 
 Official Site

Indoor arenas in Oklahoma
Basketball venues in Oklahoma
Buildings and structures in Enid, Oklahoma